Norman Kendrew (6 December 1908 – 12 September 1966) was an English cricketer. He played one first-class match for Bengal in 1940/41.

References

External links
 

1908 births
1966 deaths
English cricketers
Bengal cricketers
People from Kingston upon Thames